Sharp Corporation design and manufacture mobile phone handsets for the Japanese ('domestic') market and for overseas customers. Handset models produced include several distinct ranges:

GX

Sharp GX1: 'Candybar' style, operator O2-only, relatively small production run, launched October 2002
Sharp GX10: 'Flip' style, sold >1 million units. 2003 3GSM World Congress Best Handset.
 Sharp GX10i
 Sharp GX10m
 Sharp GX10n
 Sharp GX12
 Sharp GX13
Sharp GX15: 'Candybar' style, QQVGA screen. sold more than 3 million units.
Sharp GX17: update version of GX15.
 Sharp GX18
Sharp GX20: 'Flip' style, successor to GX10, 2G, tri-band GSM, launched 3Q 2003 - standby 220-250hr, video, infrared
 Sharp GX20n
 Sharp GX21
 Sharp GX22
 Sharp GX23
Sharp GX25: 'Flip' style, fine pitch QVGA screen. sold more than 2 million.
 Sharp GX27
Sharp GX29: Update version of GX25.
Sharp GX30: 1st 1mega pixel camera phone for EU. Quad band GSM.
 Sharp GX30i
 Sharp GX31
 Sharp GX32
Sharp GX33: Lowend tri band GSM phone.
Sharp GX34: GX33 + memory card slot + MP3 player. Extremely rare.
 Sharp GX40

SX
 Sharp SX33A
 Sharp SX313
 Sharp SX663
 Sharp SX813
 Sharp SX833
 Sharp SX862

TM
Sharp TM100: slider phone. EU only.
Sharp TM150: T-Mobile USA-only model. 1.3Mpixel tri-band GSM phone.
Sharp TM200: the first 2Mpixel GSM camera phone. Quite few production.

WS
 Sharp WS003SH
 Sharp WS007SH
 Sharp WS011SH
 Sharp WS020SH

WX
 Sharp WX-T81
 Sharp WX-T82
 Sharp WX-T91
 Sharp WX-T92
 Sharp WX-T825
 Sharp WX-T923
 Sharp WX-T930

Other US Models
Verizon Wireless Z800: Dual band CDMA phone. Unique antenna position. Launched at March 2002.
Sharp FX:Sidekick like style. MediaFlo W-CDMA phone for AT&T Mobility.
Sharp FX Plus: Android phone for AT&T Mobility. No MediaFlo.

Vodafone or other operators 
Sharp 802:marketed for Vodafone EU/NZ and Japan with different software and keypad.
Sharp 902:marketed for Vodafone EU/NZ and Japan with different software and keypad.
Sharp 903:marketed for Vodafone EU/NZ and Japan with different software and keypad.
Sharp 804
Sharp 550SH
Sharp 770SH
Sharp 703:marketed for Vodafone  EU/NZ and Japan with different software and keypad.
Sharp SX862/Sharp WX-T92
Sharp SH6010C
Sharp SH9020C/Sharp WX-T923
Sharp SH1810C/Sharp WX-T930

JDM (Japan Domestic Model)  
SoftBank
Sharp 705SH
Sharp V801SH
Sharp 813SH
Sharp 814SH
Sharp 815SH
Sharp 816SH
Sharp 820SH
Sharp 821SH
Sharp 822SH
Sharp 880SH
Sharp 904SH
Sharp 905SH
Sharp 910SH
Sharp 911SH
Sharp 912SH
Sharp 913SH
Sharp 913SH G-Type Char
Sharp 920SH
Sharp 922SH
Sharp 923SH 
Sharp 930SH
Sharp 931SH
Sharp 932SH
Sharp 933SH 
Sharp 934SH
Sharp 935SH
Sharp 936SH
NTT docomo
Sharp SH-01A: Cycloid style, 8Mpixel CCD camera, biometrics authenticate, 3.2 inches 480×854 FWVGA MobileASV, Oneseg Digital-TV, DolbyMobile
Sharp SH-02A: 5MPixel, OEL sub-display, 3 inches 480×854 FWVGA MobileASV, Oneseg Digital-TV
Sharp SH-03A: 8Mpixel CCD camera, biometrics authenticate, 3 inches Touch Screen 480×854 FWVGA MobileASV, Oneseg Digital-TV, DolbyMobile
Sharp SH-04A: 5Mpixel, QWERTY keyboard, 3.5 inch Touch screen 480×854 FWVGA MobileASV, Oneseg Digital-TV
Sharp SH-05A: 8Mpixel, 3 inches screen 480×854 FWVGA MobileASV, Oneseg Digital-TV
Sharp SH-06A: 10Mpixel CCD camera, 3.3 inches 480x 854 Touch Screen FWVGA, Oneseg Digital- TV, GPS, JAVA
Sharp SH-07A: 10Mpixel CCD camera, 3.3 inches 480x 854 Touch Screen FWVGA
Sharp SH-08A: 8Mpixel, 3 inches screen 480×854 FWVGA MobileASV, Oneseg Digital-TV, Solar recharge
Sharp SH906i: 5Mpixel CMOS camera, 3 inches 480x 854 Touch Screen
Sharp SH-01B: 12Mpixel CCD camera, 3.4 inches 480x 854 Screen FWVGA
Sharp SH-02B: 8Mpixel CCD camera, 3.4 inches 480x 854 Screen FWVGA
Sharp SH-02B marimekko Edition
Sharp SH-03B: 5Mpixel CMOS camera, 3.7 inches 480x 854 Touch Screen FWVGA
Sharp SH-04B: 8Mpixel CCD camera, 3.0 inches 480x 854 Screen FWVGA
Sharp SH-05B: 5Mpixel CMOS camera, 3.0 inches 480x 854 Screen FWVGA
Sharp SH-07B
Sharp SH-08B
Sharp SH-09B
Sharp SH-10B
Sharp SH-06B
Sharp SH-01C
Sharp SH-02C
Sharp SH-03C
Sharp SH-04C
Sharp SH-05C
Sharp SH-06C
Sharp SH-08C
Sharp SH-09C
Sharp SH-10C
Sharp SH-11C
Sharp SH-12C Dual 8Mpixel, 4.2 inches 720 x 1280
Sharp SH-13C
Sharp SH-01D
Sharp SH-02D
Sharp SH-03D
Sharp SH-04D
Sharp SH-05D 
Sharp SH-06D: 8Mpixel, 4.5 inches, 720 x 1280
Sharp SH-06D NERV Edition
Sharp SH-07D
Sharp SH-09D
Sharp SH-10D
Sharp SH-01E: Release in October 2012, 12M pixels CMOS camera, 4.1 inches 540x960 CG Silicon QHD, MSM8960 1.5 GHz (Dual-core), 1 GB RAM, 16 GB ROM, Max 64 GB microSDXC, Android 4.0
Sharp SH-01E Vivienne Westwood Edition: Release in December 2012
Sharp SH-02E: Release on November, 2012, 16M pixels CMOS camera, 4.9 inches 720x1280 IGZO HD, APQ8064 1.5 GHz (Quad-core), 2 GB RAM, 32 GB ROM, Max 64 GB microSDXC, Android 4.0
Sharp SH-03E: Release in December 2012, 5M pixels CMOS camera, 3.0 inches 480x854 FWVGA
Sharp SH-04E: Release on January, 2013, 13M pixels CMOS camera, 4.5 inches 720x1280 S-CG Silicon HD, APQ8064 1.5 GHz (Quad-core), 2 GB RAM, 16 GB ROM, Max 64 GB microSDXC, Android 4.1
Sharp SH-05E: Release in February 2013, 12M pixels CMOS camera, 4.1 inches 540x960 CG Silicon QHD, MSM8960 1.5 MHz (Dual core), 1 GB RAM, 8 GB ROM, Max 64 GB microSDXC, Android 4.0, imadoco search
Sharp SH-06E: Release in May 2013, 13M pixels CMOS camera, 4.8 inches 1080x1920 IGZO FHD (460 ppi), APQ8064T 1.7 GHz (Quad-core), 2 GB RAM, 32 GB ROM, Max 64 GB microSDXC, Android 4.2
Sharp SH-07E: Release in June 2013, 13M pixels CMOS camera, 4.3 inches 720x1280 S-CG Silicon HD, APQ8064T 1.7 GHz (Quad-core), 2 GB RAM, 32 GB ROM, Max 64 GB microSDXC, Android 4.2
Sharp SH-01F: Release in November 2013, 16M pixels CMOS camera, 5.01 inches 1080x1920 IGZO FHD (440 ppi), MSM8974 2.2 GHz (Quad-core), 2 GB RAM, 32 GB ROM, Max 64 GB microSDXC, Android 4.2
Sharp SH-02F: Release in January 2014, 13M pixels CMOS camera, 4.52 inches 1080x1920 IGZO FHD (487 ppi), MSM8974 2.2 GHz (Quad-core), 2 GB RAM, 16 GB ROM, Max 64 GB microSDXC, Android 4.2.2
Sharp SH-03F: Release in February 2014, 12M pixels CMOS camera, 4.1 inches 540x960 QHD, MSM8960 1.5 MHz (Dual core), 1 GB RAM, 8 GB ROM, Max 32 GB microSDHC, Androdid 4.0.4, imadoco search

Powered by Danger Devices 
Danger Hiptop 2 / T-Mobile Sidekick 2
Danger Hiptop 3 / T-Mobile Sidekick 3.
Danger Hiptop ID / T-Mobile Sidekick ID
Danger Hiptop LX / T-Mobile Sidekick LX
Danger Hiptop 2008 / T-Mobile Sidekick (model 2008)

Note that Sharp is just a manufacturer of the t-mobile sidekick, which is designed by Danger.

Microsoft (Danger/PMX) KIN phones:

Microsoft KIN One and Two

Smartphone 
Sharp AQUOS Crystal SH825Wi (Indonesia only)
SHARP AQUOS Zero
SHARP IS05

References 

Sharp mobile phones